Gabriel Da Parma or Gabriele di Parma (fl. 1370s) was a pirate captain of Bari who become known for raiding ships on the Adriatic coast. He was from the Carrarese family. In 1391, Da Parma wanted revenge against the Ragusans for stopping his raids in the Adriatic sea. The conflicts continued until 1425.

References 

People from Bari
Italian pirates